How Hi the Fi, subtitled A Buck Clayton Jam Session, is an album by trumpeter Buck Clayton which was recorded in 1953 and 1954 and released on the Columbia label.

Reception

The Allmusic review by Scott Yanow stated "The most memorable soloists are the rambunctious Trummy Young, the harmonically advanced chordings of Jimmy Jones and an exuberant Woody Herman who was rarely heard in this type of jam session setting. With Clayton having worked out some ensemble riffs for the horns beforehand and plenty of space left for spontaneity, this music has plenty of magic".

Track listing
 "How Hi the Fi" (Buck Clayton) – 13:40
 "Blue Moon" (Richard Rodgers, Lorenz Hart) – 14:00
 "Sentimental Journey" (Les Brown, Ben Homer, Bud Green) – 14:45
 "Moten Swing" (Bennie Moten, Buster Moten) – 13:30
Recorded in NYC on December 14, 1953 (tracks 3 & 4) and March 31, 1954 (tracks 1 & 2)

Personnel
Buck Clayton – trumpet
Joe Newman (tracks 3 & 4), Joe Thomas (tracks 1 & 2) – trumpet
Urbie Green, Benny Powell (tracks 3 & 4), Trummy Young (tracks 1 & 2) – trombone
Woody Herman – clarinet (tracks 1 & 2)
Lem Davis – alto saxophone
Al Cohn (tracks 1 & 2), Julian Dash – tenor saxophone
Charles Fowlkes – baritone saxophone (tracks 3 & 4)
Jimmy Jones (tracks 1 & 2), Sir Charles Thompson (tracks 3 & 4) – piano
Steve Jordan (tracks 1 & 2), Freddie Green (tracks 3 & 4) – guitar
Walter Page – bass 
Jo Jones – drums

References

1954 albums
Buck Clayton albums
Columbia Records albums
Albums produced by George Avakian